Wulguru is a genus of acoels belonging to the family Convolutidae.

The species of this genus are found in Eastern Australia.

Species:
 Wulguru cuspidata Winsor, 1988

References

Acoelomorphs